Blair Bridge may refer to:

Blair Bridge (New Hampshire), across the Pemigewasset River, near Campton, New Hampshire, US
Blair Bridge (Union Pacific Railroad), across the Missouri River, near Blair, Nebraska, US
Blair Bridge (U.S. Route 30), across the Missouri River, near Blair, Nebraska, US, also known as the Abraham Lincoln Memorial Bridge
a bridge on Washington State Route 509, demolished in the 1990s

See also
 Blairs Ridge